Pedro Olea (30 June 1938, Bilbao) is a Spanish screenwriter, film producer and film director. His 1984 film Akelarre was entered into the 34th Berlin International Film Festival.

Selected directorial filmography
 Días de viejo color (1968)
 El bosque del lobo (1971)
 La casa sin fronteras (1972)
 No es bueno que el hombre esté solo (1973)
 Akelarre (1984)
 Bandera negra (1986)
 La Leyenda del cura de Bargota (1990)
 El Día que nací yo (1991)
 El Maestro de esgrima (1992)
 Morirás en Chafarinas (1994)
 Beyond the Garden (1996)
 Más allá del jardín (1997)
 Tiempo de tormenta (2003)
 ¡Hay motivo! (2004)
 La conspiracion (2012)

Filmography as producer
 El bosque del lobo (1971)
 El maestro de esgrima (1992)
 Los novios búlgaros (Bulgarian Lovers) (2002, directed by Eloy de la Iglesia).
 Los managers (2006, directed by  Fernando Guillén Cuervo).

References

External links

1938 births
Living people
Spanish film directors
Spanish film producers
Spanish screenwriters
Spanish male writers
Male screenwriters
People from Bilbao
Film directors from the Basque Country (autonomous community)